Ernest Walter Gorton McAlpine (11 February 1902 – 1 June 1984) was an Australian rules footballer who played with Carlton in the Victorian Football League (VFL).

Notes

External links 

Ernie McAlpine's profile at Blueseum

1902 births
1984 deaths
Carlton Football Club players
Australian rules footballers from New South Wales